Durlung  is a popular village in Kushma Municipality in Parbat District in the Gandaki Province of central Nepal. The formerly Village Development committee was annexed to form the municipality since 18 May 2014. At the time of the 1991 Nepal census it had a population of 3202 people living in 659 individual households. Durlung kot mandir is quite famous historical place. One of the king used to live there when Nepal had distributed in 22/24 state. Most of the people are BRAHMINS followed by Chhetri, Gurung, Magar, Kami and other castes. The main occupation of this village is Agriculture. 
There is a huge problem of youth migration in this village due to the reason that no higher education colleges and employment opportunities are not available in the village.
The village is situated at the altitude of around 1200m to 1500m. We can reach Durlung village by getting a bus to Kushma from any city of Nepal. After reaching Kushma we can get bus from Durlung chowk, Kushma or can hire a jeep or taxi to Durlung. It takes around 1 hour from Kushma by bus. After reaching Durlung Kot a beautiful temple of 'durlung ka bhume devata' a god of Durlung. Every year during Dashain festival many animals are sacrificed for the god and many people around the district come to visit this historical place. Durlung kot have a view tower and one can enjoy the beautiful sceneries of Machhapuchhre and Annapurna mountain range. The place has huge religious and tourism potential.

External links
UN map of the municipalities of Parbat District

Populated places in Parbat District